Polland is a surname. Notable people with the surname include: 

David Polland (born 1908), American chess master
Eddie Polland (born 1947), Northern Irish golfer
Madeleine A. Polland (1918–2005), prolific Irish children's author
Milton Rice Polland (1909–2006), American businessman and political activist
Pamela Polland (born 1944), American singer-songwriter
Willie Polland (1934–2010), Scottish footballer